Crest is an unincorporated community in Benton County, Missouri, United States.

The community was so named on account of its lofty elevation.

References

Unincorporated communities in Benton County, Missouri
Unincorporated communities in Missouri